The Hopewell Cape Formation is a geological formation of Carboniferous age (late Viséan to late Namurian or early Westphalian stage) in New Brunswick.

References

Carboniferous New Brunswick
Geologic formations of New Brunswick